Hypochondroplasia (HCH) is a developmental disorder caused by an autosomal dominant genetic defect in the fibroblast growth factor receptor 3 gene (FGFR3) that results in a disproportionately short stature, micromelia and a head that appears large in comparison with the underdeveloped portions of the body. It is classified as short-limbed dwarfism.

Signs and symptoms
Individuals affected by this disorder appear normal at birth. As the infant grows, however, their arms and legs do not develop properly, and their body becomes thicker and shorter than normal. The following are characteristics consistent with this condition:
 Brachydactyly
 Short stature
 Micromelia
 Skeletal dysplasia
 Abnormality of femur

Cause
Hypochondroplasia is inherited as an autosomal dominant trait affecting the FGFR3 gene on chromosome 4p16.3. There is currently no cure for this condition.

Pathophysiology

This disorder results from mutations in the proximal tyrosine kinase domain of the FGFR3 gene. This gene plays an important role in embryonic development, helping to regulate activities such as cell division, migration and differentiation.

Hypochondroplasia can be caused by point mutations such as p. Lys650Asn. In FGFR3, some 20 different mutations have been associated with hypochondroplasia, and it seems to have a role in skeletal dysplasia.

Diagnosis 
The diagnosis of this condition can be done via X-rays (with lack of normal distance L1 to L5), and additionally genetic testing is available to ascertain hypochondroplasia. However, the physical characteristics are one of the most important in determining the condition.

Treatment

Treatment of hypochondroplasia usually takes the form of orthopedic surgery and physical therapy. Genetic counseling is advised for individuals and their families. Specifically in the case of spinal stenosis, one option is laminectomy.

Prognosis

See also
 Achondroplasia
 List of congenital disorders

References

Further reading

External links 

Skeletal system
Growth disorders
Cell surface receptor deficiencies
Autosomal dominant disorders
Rare diseases